Randy Armstrong may refer to:
Randy Armstrong (musician), American musician and multi-instrumentalist
Randy Armstrong (politician) (elected 2016), American politician from Idaho
Randy Armstrong (Red), founder member in 2002 of US Christian rock band Red